Baraga County is a county in the Upper Peninsula in the U.S. state of Michigan. As of the 2020 Census, the population was 8,158, making it Michigan's fifth-least populous county. The county seat is L'Anse. The county is named after Bishop Frederic Baraga, a Catholic missionary who ministered to the Ojibwa Indians in the Michigan Territory.

The L'Anse Indian Reservation of the Ojibwa is within Baraga County.

Geography

The county is located in the state's Upper Peninsula on the shore of Lake Superior, at the southeast base of the Keweenaw Peninsula. The villages of Baraga and L'Anse are located at the base of Lake Superior's Keweenaw Bay. Point Abbaye projects north into the lake, enclosing Huron Bay. The eastern two-thirds of the county includes much of the Huron Mountains, including Mount Arvon—the highest natural point in Michigan at 1,979 feet (603 m).

Major highways
  – runs north–south through the upper central part of county. The highway enters at the northeast corner of the county on the west shore of Keeweenaw Bay and runs south along the shoreline to Baraga and L'Anse, then turns inland (south) past Alberta, then east through Nestoria and Three Lakes. It exits into Marquette County at Imperial Heights.
  – runs south from its intersection with US-41 south of Alberta into Iron County.
  – enters the west side of the county then runs east and east-northeast to the intersection with US-141 at Covington.
  – runs east–west through the northwest corner of county. It enters from Alston in Houghton County, then runs east to intersection with US-41 at Baraga.

Adjacent counties
 Marquette County (east)
 Iron County (south)
 Houghton County (west)

National protected areas
 Keweenaw National Historical Park (part)
 Ottawa National Forest (part)

Demographics

The 2010 United States Census indicates Baraga County had a population of 8,860. This increase of 114 people from the 2000 United States Census. is a 1.3% population growth. In 2010 there were 3,444 households and 2,209 families in the county. The population density was 10 people per square mile (4/km2). There were 5,270 housing units at an average density of 6 per square mile (2/km2). 75.0% of the population was White, 13.1% Native American, 7.2% Black or African American, 0.1% Asian, 0.2% of some other race and 4.4% of two or more races. 1.0% were Hispanic or Latino (of any race). 22.5% were of Finnish, 9.1% German, 8.8% French, French Canadian or Cajun, 5.6% English and 5.5% Irish ancestry.

There were 3,444 households, out of which 25.2% had children under the age of 18 living with them, 47.4% were married couples living together, 10.9% had a female householder with no husband present, and 35.9% were non-families. 31.6% of all households were made up of individuals, and 13% had someone living alone who was 65 years of age or older. The average household size was 2.28 and the average family size was 2.82.

The age distribution of the county population was the following: 20.2% were under the age of 18, 7% from 18 to 24, 25.7% from 25 to 44, 29.7% from 45 to 64, and 17.2% who were 65 years of age or older. The median age was 42.9 years. 54.9% of the population was male, 45.1% was female.

The median income for a household in the county was $40,115, and the median income for a family was $50,996. The per capita income for the county was $19,076. About 9.5% of families and 13% of the population were below the poverty line, including 19.2% of those under age 18 and 6.7% of those age 65 or over.

Government
Baraga County has tended to support Republican candidates. Since 1884 its voters have selected the Republican Party nominee in 64% (22 of 35) of the national elections through 2020, and in all presidential elections since 2000.

Baraga County operates the County jail, maintains rural roads, operates the major local courts, records deeds, mortgages, and vital records, administers public health regulations, and participates with the state in the provision of social services. The county board of commissioners controls the budget and has limited authority to make laws or ordinances. In Michigan, most local government functions – police and fire, building and zoning, tax assessment, street maintenance etc. – are the responsibility of individual cities and townships.

Communities

Villages
 Baraga
 L'Anse (county seat)

Census-designated place
 Zeba

Other unincorporated communities

 Alberta
 Arnheim
 Arvon
 Assinins (called Fewsville 1872–1894)
 Aura
 Bear Town
 Beaufort Lake
 Covington
 Herman
 Huron Bay
 Imperial Heights
 Keweenaw Bay
 Laughs Lake
 McComb Corner
 Nestoria
 Pelkie
 Pequaming
 Saint Cyr
 Skanee
 Summit
 Three Lakes
 Tioga
 Tunis
 Vermilac
 Watton

Townships

 Arvon Township
 Baraga Township
 Covington Township
 L'Anse Township
 Spurr Township

Indian reservations
 The L'Anse Indian Reservation occupies two sections of Baraga County within portions of Baraga, L'Anse, and Arvon townships.  The reservation also has very small portion in Chocolay Charter Township in neighboring Marquette County to the east.

See also
 List of Michigan State Historic Sites in Baraga County, Michigan
 National Register of Historic Places listings in Baraga County, Michigan

References

External links
 Baraga County Government website
 Baraga County Profile, Sam M Cohodas Regional Economist, Tawni Hunt Ferrarini, Ph.D.
 Western Upper Peninsula Planning & Development Region

 
Michigan counties
1875 establishments in Michigan